Purihasa is a census town in the Golmuri-cum-Jugsalai CD block in the Dhalbhum subdivision of the Purbi Singhbhum district in the Indian state of Jharkhand.

Geography

Location 

Jamshedpur Urban Agglomeration 
With its recognition as an industrial town as early as the 1911 census, Jamshedpur was set on the road of steady population growth, as large number of emigrants flocked in for work opportunities. While in the earlier decades the central nucleus grew, in the later decades towns around Jamshedpur grew rapidly. In 2011, Jamshedpur Urban Agglomeration included 13 urban centres, with a total population of 1.3 million people. However, in more recent years, Jamshedpur UA "has lacked the growth and development observed around other similar industrial towns in western and southern India."

Civic administration
Sundarnagar police station serves the area.

Demographics 
According to the 2011 Census of India, Purihasa had a total population of 7,897, of which 4,051 (51%) were males and 3,846 (49%) were females. Population in the age range 0-6 years was 1,141. The total number of literate persons in Purihasa was 5,025 (74.38% of the population over 6 years). 

(*For language details see Golmuri-cum-Jugsalai block#Language and religion) 

Jamshedpur Urban Agglomeration includes: Jamshedpur (Industrial Town), Jamshedpur (NAC), Tata Nagar Railway Colony (OG), Mango (NAC),  Jugsalai (M), Bagbera (CT), Chhota Gobindpur (CT), Haludbani (CT), Sarjamda (CT), Gadhra (CT), Ghorabandha (CT), Purihasa (CT), Adityapur (M Corp.), Chota Gamahria (CT) and Kapali (CT).

Infrastructure  
Among the civic amenities, it had  of roads with open drains, the protected water supply involved tap water from treated sources, tube well/ bore well, overhead tank. It had 1,339 domestic electric connections, 4 road lighting points. Among the medical facilities, it had 2 hospitals, 1 dispensary, 1 health centre, 1 family welfare centre, 1 maternity and child welfare centre, 2 maternity homes, 1 nursing home, 1 veterinary hospital, 3 medicine shops. Among the educational facilities it had 4 primary schools, 2 middle schools, 2 secondary schools, 1 senior secondary school, 1 general degree college. It had 1 non-formal education centre (Sarva Shiksha Abhiyan). Among social, cultural and recreational facilities, it had 1 stadium. It had the branch offices of 1 nationalised bank, 1 cooperative bank.

Transport 
State Highway 6 passes through Purihasa.

Education 
Lal Bahadur Shastri Memorial College was established in 1971 at Karandih.

References 
 

 

Cities and towns in East Singhbhum district 
Neighbourhoods in Jamshedpur